The 2002 Air Canada Cup was Canada's 24th annual national midget 'AAA' hockey championship, played April 22–28, 2002 at the K. C. Irving Regional Centre in Bathurst, New Brunswick.  The Tisdale Trojans from Saskatchewan defeated the Dartmouth Subways from Nova Scotia 6-2 in the gold medal game to win the national title.

This season's Air Canada Cup gained extra attention from media and hockey scouts as 14-year-old prodigy Sidney Crosby competed as a member of the Dartmouth Subways.  He led them to a berth in the championship game, the first time that a team from Atlantic Canada had ever advanced to the gold medal game.  Crosby led the round robin in scoring with 18 points in five games and was named the Most Valuable Player.  Other notable players competing at the 2002 Air Canada Cup were Olivier Latendresse, Guillaume Latendresse, Andrew Gordon, Shaun Heshka, Tyson Strachan, Jay Rosehill, and Torrey Mitchell.

Teams

Round robin

Standings

Scores

Red Deer 9 - Timmins 2
Collège Charles-Lemoyne 3 - Tisdale 2
Dartmouth 8 - Miramichi 2
Dartmouth 3 - Collège Charles-Lemoyne 3
Tisdale 3 - Timmins 0
Red Deer 8 - Miramichi 3
Timmins 7 - Collège Charles-Lemoyne 5
Red Deer 8 - Dartmouth 6
Tisale 3 - Miramichi 2
Dartmouth 5 - Timmins 4
Red Deer 5 - Tisdale 3
Collège Charles-Lemoyne 10 - Miramichi 0
Tisdale 5 - Dartmouth 1
Collège Charles-Lemoyne 6 - Red Deer 1
Timmins 6 - Miramichi 5

Playoffs

Semi-finals
Dartmouth 5 - Red Deer 4
Tisdale 4 - Collège Charles-Lemoyne 1

Bronze-medal game
Collège Charles-Lemoyne 6 - Red Deer 4

Gold-medal game
Tisdale 6 - Dartmouth 2

Individual awards
Most Valuable Player: Sidney Crosby (Dartmouth)
Top Scorer: Sidney Crosby (Dartmouth)
Top Forward: Olivier Latendresse (Collège Charles-Lemoyne)
Top Defenseman: Shaun Heshka (Tisdale)
Top Goaltender: François Thuot (Collège Charles-Lemoyne)
Most Sportsmanlike Player: Andrew Gordon (Dartmouth)

Regional Playdowns

Atlantic Region 
The Dartmouth Subways advanced by winning their regional tournament, which was played April 3–7, 2002 at the Community Gardens Arena Complex in Kensington, Prince Edward Island.

Quebec 
The Riverains du Collège Charles-Lemoyne advanced by capturing the Quebec Midget AAA League title.

Central Region 
The Timmins Majors advanced by winning their regional tournament, which was played April 2–7, 2002 at the McIntyre Community Building in Timmins, Ontario.

West Region 
The Tisdale Trojans advanced by winning their regional tournament, which was played April 3–7, 2002 at the T.G. Smith Centre in Steinbach, Manitoba.

Pacific Region 
The Red Deer Chiefs advanced by winning their regional tournament, which was played April 3–7, 2002 in Yellowknife, Northwest Territories.

See also
Telus Cup

References

External links
2002 Air Canada Cup Home Page
Hockey Canada-Telus Cup Guide and Record Book

Telus Cup
Air Canada Cup
Sport in Bathurst, New Brunswick
April 2002 sports events in Canada
Ice hockey competitions in New Brunswick
2002 in New Brunswick